Chimerella is a small genus of glass frogs, family Centrolenidae. They are found on the Amazonian slopes of the Andes in Ecuador and Peru, possibly extending into Colombia.

Species
There are two species:
 Chimerella corleone Twomey, Delia, and Castroviejo-Fisher, 2014
 Chimerella mariaelenae (Cisneros-Heredia and McDiarmid, 2006)

References

 
Glass frogs
Amphibians of South America
Amphibian genera
Taxa named by José Ayarzagüena
Taxa named by Santiago Castroviejo-Fisher